Trapped by Boston Blackie is a 1948 American crime drama directed by Seymour Friedman. It is the thirteenth of fourteen Columbia Pictures films starring Chester Morris as reformed crook Boston Blackie, and the final film with George E. Stone as "The Runt".

Plot
While consoling Helen, the widow of Blackie's detective friend Joe Kenyon who died in a suspicious auto accident, Blackie and The Runt offer their services for a security job.  They are tasked with securing an extremely expensive pearl necklace for a wealthy client named Mrs. Carter.  When the pearls turn up missing Blackie and The Runt become the prime suspects and must clear their names and find the real culprit along with any connection to Joe Kenyon's suspicious death.

Cast
 Chester Morris as Boston Blackie
 June Vincent as Doris Howell
 Richard Lane as Inspector Farraday
 Patricia White as Joan Howell
 Edward Norris as Igor Borio
 George E. Stone as "The Runt"
 Frank Sully as Sergeant Matthews
 Fay Baker as Sandra Doray
 William Forrest as Mason Carter (uncredited)

References

External links
 
 
 

1948 films
American crime drama films
American black-and-white films
1948 crime drama films
Columbia Pictures films
Films directed by Seymour Friedman
Boston Blackie films
1940s English-language films
1940s American films